The International Alliance of Women (IAW; , AIF) is an international non-governmental organization that works to promote women's rights and gender equality. It was historically the main international organization that campaigned for women's suffrage. IAW stands for an inclusive, intersectional and progressive liberal feminism on the basis of human rights, and has a liberal internationalist outlook. IAW's principles state that all genders are "born equally free [and are] equally entitled to the free exercise of their individual rights and liberty," that "women’s rights are human rights" and that "human rights are universal, indivisible and interrelated." In 1904 the Alliance adopted gold (or yellow) as its color, the color associated with the women's suffrage movement in the United States since 1867 and the oldest symbol of women's rights; through the Alliance's influence gold and white became the principal colors of the mainstream international women's suffrage movement.

IAW is traditionally the dominant international non-governmental organization within the liberal (or bourgeois) women's movement. The basic principle of IAW is that the full and equal enjoyment of human rights is due to all women and girls. It is one of the oldest, largest and most influential organizations in its field. The organization was founded as the International Woman Suffrage Alliance (IWSA) in 1904 in Berlin, Germany, by Carrie Chapman Catt, Millicent Fawcett, Susan B. Anthony and other leading feminists from around the world to campaign for women's suffrage. IWSA was headquartered in London, and it was the preeminent international women's suffrage organization. Its emphasis has since shifted to a broad human rights focus. As part of the liberal women's rights movement IAW maintained a clear pro-Western stance throughout the Cold War. Today it represents over 50 organizations world-wide comprising several hundred thousand members, and has its seat in Geneva.

From 1926, the organization had strong ties to the League of Nations. Since 1947, IAW has had general consultative status to the United Nations Economic and Social Council, the highest UN status possible for a non-governmental organization, the fourth organization to be granted this status. IAW also has participatory status with the Council of Europe. It has representatives at the UN headquarters in New York, the UN office in Geneva, the UN office in Vienna, UNESCO in Paris, the Food and Agriculture Organization in Rome and the Council of Europe in Strasbourg. It also has representatives to the Arab League in Cairo and the Gulf Countries Council in Riyadh, and is a member of the European Women's Lobby in Brussels. IAW's working languages are English and French.

IAW understands LGBT rights as an integral part of feminism and has expressed concern over "anti-trans voices [that] are becoming ever louder and [that] are threatening feminist solidarity across borders."

History

The International Alliance of Women, formerly the International Woman Suffrage Alliance, is historically the most important international organization within the bourgeois-liberal women's rights movement. The decision for the establishment of the organization was taken in Washington in 1902 by suffragists frustrated at the reluctance of the International Council of Women to support women's suffrage. As such the Alliance was a more progressive organization that emphasized legal and political equality between women and men from the onset. The Alliance was formally constituted during the Second conference in Berlin in 1904 as the International Woman Suffrage Alliance (IWSA), and was headquartered in London for much of its history. Its founders included Carrie Chapman Catt, Millicent Fawcett, Helene Lange, Susan B. Anthony, Anita Augspurg, Rachel Foster Avery, and Käthe Schirmacher.

Amongst subsequent congresses were those held in Copenhagen (1906), Amsterdam (1908), London (1909), Stockholm (June 1911), and Budapest (1913). The French Union for Women's Suffrage (UFSF), founded in February 1909, was formally recognized by the IWFA congress in London in April 1909 as representing the French suffrage movement. IWSA also started its own monthly journal, the Jus Suffragii. IWSA, influenced by moderate liberal feminist Millicent Fawcett against the militancy of suffragettes in the style of Emmeline Pankhurst, refused membership to the WSPU at their 1906 Copenhagen meeting.

In the interwar period, the organization was one of the three major international "bourgeois" women's organizations, alongside the International Council of Women (ICW) and the Women's International League for Peace and Freedom (WILPF). Of these, IWSA (IAW) was more progressive and oriented towards legal equality and equal citizenship than ICW. At the same time, IWSA was more conservative than WILPF. The organization's members were often associated with liberal parties and movements, but some were also progressive conservatives or liberal conservatives. Most IAW members held "similar views of society and societal change, which assumed a top-down approach, where the elite were cast as the true agents of development." At the same time IAW claimed to speak on behalf of all women.

In the late 1920s, the organization changed its name to the International Alliance of Women for Suffrage and Equal Citizenship, and in 1946 this was altered to its current name, International Alliance of Women. The first Executive Board included Carrie Chapman Catt (President), Anita Augspurg (1st Vice President), Donovan Bolden (2nd Vice President) and Rachel Foster Avery (Secretary).

The organization's first President Carrie Chapman Catt also founded the League of Women Voters in the United States during her presidency.

Since the onset of the Cold War the alliance's liberal internationalist outlook was strengthened. The alliance held firm anti-communist views and maintained a clear pro-Western stance throughout the Cold War. Its second President, Dame Margery Corbett Ashby, wrote that "it was us or the communist women who would organize the Near East." In the alliance's journal International Women’s News it was stated in 1946 that the support of the United Nations and democracy must "remain in the forefront of our programme." Its third President Hanna Rydh worked actively to build cooperation in developing countries, partially to counteract communism.

IAW's members in the Nordic countries were also members of the Joint Organization of Nordic Women's Rights Associations.

Policies

LGBT+ rights
IAW shares the mainstream feminist position on LGBT+ rights and views the struggle for LGBT+ rights as an integral part of feminism. In 2021 IAW and its affiliate, the Icelandic Women's Rights Association (IWRA), organized a CSW forum on how the women's rights movement could counter "anti-trans voices [that] are becoming ever louder and [that] are threatening feminist solidarity across borders," where IAW President Marion Böker discussed her organization's trans-inclusive position. IWRA has stated that "IWRA works for the rights of all women – feminism without trans women is no feminism at all." IAW's Danish affiliate, the Danish Women's Society, has said that it takes homophobia and transphobia very seriously, that "we support all initiatives that promote the rights of gay and transgender people" and that "we see the LGBTQA movement as close allies in the struggle against inequality and we fight together for a society where gender and sexuality do not limit an individual." IAW's Norwegian affiliate, the Norwegian Association for Women's Rights, supports legal protections against discrimination and hate speech on the basis of sexual orientation, gender identity and gender expression. IAW affiliates such as Deutscher Frauenring advocate for trans-inclusive feminism. The Icelandic Women's Rights Association has published a report on improving the situation of non-binary people in Iceland.

Symbols

The organization adopted gold (or yellow; Or in heraldry) as its color in 1904. The color, derived from the sunflower, is the oldest symbol of women's rights. It had been adopted by American suffragists in 1867 and became the principal color of the American women's suffrage movement, typically used alongside white. Through the influence of the Alliance, gold and white became the principal colors of the mainstream international women's suffrage movement.

Conferences
 1st, Washington, D.C., 1902
 2nd, Berlin, 1904
 3rd, Copenhagen, 1906
 4th, Amsterdam, 1908
 5th, London, 1909
 6th, Stockholm, 1911
 7th, Budapest, 1913
 8th, Geneva, 1920
 9th, Rome, 1923 
 10th, Paris, 1926
 11th, Berlin, 1929
 12th, Istanbul, 1935
 13th, Copenhagen, 1939
 14th, Interlaken, 1946
 15th, Amsterdam, 1949
 16th, Naples, 1952
 17th, Colombo, Ceylon, 1955
 18th, Athens, 1958
 19th, Dublin, 1961
 21st, England, 1967
 22nd, Konigstein, West Germany, 1970
 23rd, New Delhi, 1973

Organization

An International Congress is held triennially in the home country of a member organization, and elects the Executive Board. The current President and Chief Representative to the United Nations is Alison Brown. The Executive Board also includes the Secretary-General, the Treasurer and until 20 other members, including two Executive Vice Presidents as well as Vice Presidents for Europe, the Arab countries, the Arab states of the Persian Gulf, Africa, and Regional Coordinators for North America, Pacific, and South East Asia.

Presidents
Carrie Chapman Catt (USA) 1904–1923
Dame Margery Corbett Ashby (UK) 1923–1946
Hanna Rydh (Sweden) 1946–1952
Ester Graff (Denmark) 1952–1958
Ezlynn Deraniyagala (Sri Lanka) 1958–1964
Begum Anwar Ahmed (Pakistan) 1964–1970
Edith Anrep (Sweden) 1970–1973
Irène de Lipkowski (France) 1973–1979
Olive Bloomer (UK) 1979–1989
Alice Yotopoulos-Marangopoulos (Greece) 1989–1996
Patricia Giles (Australia) 1996–2004
Rosy Weiss (Austria) 2004–2010
Lyda Verstegen (The Netherlands) 2010–2013
Joanna Manganara (Greece) 2013–2020
Cheryl Hayles (Canada) 2020–2021
Marion Böker (Germany) 2021–2022
Alison Brown (USA) 2022–

Current status
The IAW represents about 45 organizations world-wide as well as individual members. The IAW was granted general consultative status to the United Nations Economic and Social Council, the highest level possible, in 1947, and has participatory status with the Council of Europe. The IAW has permanent representatives in New York, Vienna, Geneva, Paris, Rome, Nairobi and Strasbourg and addresses the European Union through its membership in the European Women’s Lobby in Brussels. The IAW's current representative to the UN headquarters, Soon-Young Yoon, is also chair of the NGO Committee on the Status of Women, New York.

The IAW pays particular attention to the universal ratification and implementation without reservation of the Convention on the Elimination of All Forms of Discrimination Against Women (CEDAW) and its Optional Protocol. The current IAW Commissions deal with the topics: Justice and Human Rights; Democracy; Peace; Elimination of Violence and Health.

Members

Affiliates (full members)
Association des femmes de l’Europe Méridionale, 
African Women Lawyers Association (AWLA), 
All India Women's Conference, 
All Pakistan Women's Association, 
Association Suisse pour les Droits de la Femme, 
Bangladesh Mahila Samity, 
Canadian Federation of University Women (CFUW-FCFDU), 
Country Women’s Asociation of India, 
Danish Women's Society, 
Deutscher Frauenring, 
German Association of Female Citizens, 
Frederika Bremer Förbundet, 
Greek League for Women’s Rights, 
Hoda Chawari Association, 
Israel Federation of the Women's International Zionist Organization, 
Kvenréttindafélag Íslands, 
League of Women Voters of Nigeria, 
Lithuanian Women’s Society, 
Nederlandse Vereniging voor Vrouwenbelangen, 
Norwegian Association for Women's Rights, 
ntengwe for community development, 
L’Observatoire Marocain des Droits des Femmes (OMDF), 
Pancyprian Movement Equal Rights & Equal Responsibilities, 
Unioni Naisasialiito Suomessa Ry, 
Women's Electoral Lobby, 
Women Empowerment and Human Resource Development Centre of India, 
Zambia Alliance of Women, 

Associate members
Alliance of Women of Serbia and Montenegro, 
APWA UK, 
Association d’Aide à l’Education de l’Enfant Handicapé,  and 
Association Féminine Songmanégré pour le Développement AFD, 
Bali Women’s Union of Farming Groups, 
CEFAP – Ladies Circle, 
Frauen Netzwerk für Frieden, 
La Colombe, 
League of Women Voters of Victoria, 
Olympes da la Parole – Voices of Olympia, 
Reseau national des associations de tantines (RENATA) National Network of Aunties Association, 
Rural Women’s Network of Nepal, 
Saroj Nalini Dutt Memorial Association, 
Solidarité des femmes pour le développement, environnement et droits de l’enfant au Congo (SOFEDEC), 
Sri Lanka Women’s Association  in the UK (SLWA), 
Survie de la Mere et de l’Enfant, 
Women’s Comfort Corner,

See also
List of suffragists and suffragettes
List of women's rights activists
List of women's rights organizations
Women's suffrage organizations
Timeline of women's suffrage
Timeline of women's rights (other than voting)

References

Sources

Further reading

Archives of International Alliance of Women are held at The Women's Library at the Library of the London School of Economics
International Alliance of Women 1904-2004
International Alliance of Women Records 1906-2009 Finding Aid, Sophia Smith Collection, Smith College

External links
Official site
International Alliance of Women records Sophia Smith Collection, Smith College Special Collections
International Woman Suffrage Alliance archives at the John Rylands Library, Manchester.
Constitution in the Woman's Rights Collection, 1909. Schlesinger Library, Radcliffe Institute, Harvard University.

 
Liberal feminist organizations
International organisations based in Switzerland
Organizations with participatory status with the Council of Europe
Organizations established in 1904
Women's rights organizations
Gender equality
Human rights organisations based in Switzerland
International women's organizations
Voter rights and suffrage organizations